Susan Elizabeth Owens OBE FBA FAcSS (born 24 January 1954) is Emeritus Professor of Environment and Policy, University of Cambridge. She is Fellow Emerita of Newnham College.

Owens was a member of the Royal Commission on Environmental Pollution that produced the ‘Turning the Tide’ report which addressed the impact of fisheries on the marine environment.

She is a member of the DEFRA advisory panel on Highly Protected Marine Areas. 

She was educated at the University of East Anglia where she graduated with a BSc and a PhD entitled "The energy implications of alternative rural development patterns" in 1981. She joined the University of Cambridge as an academic in 1981. 

She was a recipient of the Royal Geographical Society's Back Award in 2000. She was made an OBE in 1998, and a Fellow of the British Academy in 2011.

References

1954 births
Living people
Alumni of the University of East Anglia
Academics of the University of Cambridge
Fellows of Newnham College, Cambridge
Officers of the Order of the British Empire
Fellows of the British Academy
Fellows of the Academy of Social Sciences
Environmental social scientists
British geographers
Women geographers